Cephaloleia immaculata is a species of rolled-leaf beetle in the family Chrysomelidae, first found in Costa Rica.

References

Further reading

McKenna, D. D. "Dissertation, Ph.D. in biology, Harvard University, Cambridge, Massachusetts (USA). Ecological and evolutionary radiation of Cephaloleia beetles (Coleoptera: Chrysomelidae). Radiación ecológica y evolutiva de los abejones Cephaloleia (Coleoptera: Chrysomelidae."
Staines, Charles L., and Carlos García-Robledo. "The genus Cephaloleia Chevrolat, 1836 (Coleoptera, Chrysomelidae, Cassidinae." ZooKeys 436 (2014): 1.
McKenna, Duane D., and Brian D. Farrell. "Molecular phylogenetics and evolution of host plant use in the Neotropical rolled leaf ‘hispine’beetle genus Cephaloleia (Chevrolat)(Chrysomelidae: Cassidinae)." Molecular Phylogenetics and Evolution 37.1 (2005): 117–131.

External links

Cassidinae
Beetles of Central America